Robert Adonis (born 16 March 1948) is a British Guianese cricketer. He played two first-class matches for Guyana between 1971 and 1975.

See also
 List of Guyanese representative cricketers

References

External links
 

1948 births
Living people
Guyanese cricketers
Guyana cricketers